The following is a list of elections for the office of Speaker of the House of Commons of the United Kingdom:

1895 Speaker of the British House of Commons election
1951 Speaker of the British House of Commons election
1965 Speaker of the British House of Commons election
1971 Speaker of the British House of Commons election
1976 Speaker of the British House of Commons election
1983 Speaker of the British House of Commons election
1992 Speaker of the British House of Commons election
2000 Speaker of the British House of Commons election
2009 Speaker of the British House of Commons election
2019 Speaker of the British House of Commons election